Ok Taec-yeon, composing as Taecyeon a.k.a TY, is a South Korean actor, entrepreneur, singer, songwriter and the main rapper of the South Korean boy group 2PM. In 2012, Taecyeon teamed up with his fellow Dankook University alumni students to produce a digital album and then began writing and composing songs for his solo stage at 2 pm Japanese Concert, 'Six Beautiful Days' in Budokan. Taecyeon started actively participating in writing and composing songs for 2 pm the following year.

Songs

References

2PM
Taecyeon